Timor Barracks is an Australian Army base in the suburb of Dundas, located about  to the north-west of Sydney's Central Business District, New South Wales. It is named after Timor. The barracks was established in 1968 and is used as a headquarters of the 8th Brigade, Air Force cadets and Army cadets.

References

Barracks in Australia